Pierre-Basile Mignault (September 30, 1854 – October 15, 1945) was a Canadian lawyer and Puisne Justice of the Supreme Court of Canada.

Born in Worcester, Massachusetts, the son of Pierre-Basile Mignault and Catherine O'Callaghan, he received a Bachelor of Civil Law degree from McGill University in 1878. He was called to the Quebec Bar in 1878. He then proceeded to practice law in Montreal.

His Droit civil canadien, a nine-volume work on Québec's civil law published during 1885–1916, and its relation to the French tradition, continues to be cited by the courts, including the Supreme Court of Canada.

As a judge on the Supreme Court of Canada during 1918–1929, Mignault also had a key role in countering a long-standing centralising tendency in Canadian private law, and in increasing the Court's sensitivity to the subtleties of Québec's legal tradition. Mignault saw Québec private law as “surtout fille de la France coutumière” (particularly the heir of French pre-revolutionary customary law), yet also a meeting place for a diversity of philosophical and cultural approaches.

He is buried in Notre Dame des Neiges Cemetery. Parc Mignault in Montreal is named in his honour.

Further reading

See also
 Supreme Court of Canada biography

References

Justices of the Supreme Court of Canada
1854 births
1945 deaths
McGill University Faculty of Law alumni
Burials at Notre Dame des Neiges Cemetery